Personal branding is the conscious and intentional effort to create and influence public perception of an individual by positioning them as an authority in their industry, elevating their credibility, and differentiating themselves from the competition, to ultimately advance their career, widen their circle of influence, and have a larger impact.

The process of personal branding involves finding your uniqueness, building a reputation on the things you want to be known for, and then allowing yourself to be known for them. Ultimately, the goal is to create something that conveys a message and that can be monetized.

Whereas some self-help practices focus on self-improvement, personal branding defines success as a form of self-packaging. The term is thought to have originated from an article written by Tom Peters in 1997. In Be Your Own Brand, first published in 1999, marketers David McNally and Karl Speak wrote: "Your brand is a perception or emotion, maintained by somebody other than you, that describes the total experience of having a relationship with you."

Individuals sometimes associate personal names or pseudonyms with their businesses. Notably, 45th President of the United States and real estate mogul Donald Trump uses his last name on properties and other enterprises (e.g. Trump Tower). Celebrities may also leverage their social status to support organizations for financial or social gain. For example, Kim Kardashian endorses brands and products through her media influence. 

The relationship between brands and consumers is dynamic and must be constantly refined. This continuous process demonstrates the ambivalence of consumerism.

A personal brand is a widely recognized and largely-uniform perception or impression of an individual based on their experience, expertise, competencies, actions and/or achievements within a community, industry, or the marketplace at large.

Personal brands may be deliberately modified to reinvent a public persona. This may be to recover from a public embarrassment, or to re-emerge from obscurity. The public perception of authenticity often determines the success of a rebranding.

History 
The idea of positioning your personal or professional identity appeared in the 1981 book Positioning: The Battle for Your Mind, by Al Ries and Jack Trout.  More specifically in "Chapter 23. Positioning Yourself and Your Career - You can benefit by using positioning strategy to advance your own career.

The concept of personal branding is often attributed to Tom Peters and his concept of "Brand You" from his 2001 book The Brand You 50 (Reinventing Work): Fifty Ways to Transform Yourself from an "Employee" into a Brand That Shouts Distinction, Commitment, and Passion, building on his earlier 1997 Fast Company article titled "The Brand Called You.

Personal branding has gained significance due to the use of the Internet, as social media and online identities affect the physical world.

Employers are increasingly using social media tools to vet applicants before offering them interviews. Practices include searching an applicant's history on sites such as Facebook and Twitter, and conducting background checks using search engines and other tools. This is leading to the decline of resume-only job applications, in favor of presenting other forms of personal branding. These may include links to a professional profile (such as LinkedIn), a personal blog, a portfolio of industry-related articles, and evidence of an online following. These efforts may improve a person's chances of obtaining a job. 

According to Alberto Chinchilla Abadías "it is advisable for the company to train its workers and managers in communication and digital skills in order to effectively use these technologies".

Social media and personal branding
Social media extends beyond just Facebook and Twitter and into the professional world as well. There are general professional profiles like LinkedIn and company or industry-specific networks, such as Slack. Because of these professional networks, self-branding is useful in finding a job or improving one's professional standing. As an online open source, social media has become a place that is fulfilled with highly reliable and resourceful information to target user identities.

Building a brand and an online presence through internal corporate networks allows for individuals to network with their colleagues, not only socially but professionally as well. This kind of interaction allows for employees to build up their personal brand relative to other employees, as well as spur innovation within the company because more people can learn from more people.

Some social media sites, like Twitter, can have a flattened, all-encompassing audience that can be composed of professional and personal contacts, which then can be seen as a more "'professional' environment with potential professional costs". Because of its explicitly public nature, Twitter becomes a double-sided platform that can be utilized in different ways depending on the amount of censorship a user decides on.

Personal branding focuses on "self-packaging," where "success is not determined by individuals' internal sets of skills, motivations, and interests but, rather, by how effectively they are…branded"; it is more about self-promotion rather than true self-expression. The difference between the two is that self-promotion is deliberately intentional in all aspects because the individual is purposely shaping their image or persona, while self-expression can even be a byproduct of promotion.

Aside from professional aspirations, personal branding can also be used on personal-level social networks to flare popularity. The online self is used as a marketing and promotional tool to brand an individual as a type of person; success on the virtual platforms then becomes "online social value [that could transform] to real rewards in the offline world." When one is branding themselves on social media they need to consider these three things: "crafting their physical footprint, creating their digital footprint, and communicating their message." A prominent example of a self-made self-branded social media icon is Tila Tequila, who rose to prominence in 2006 on the Myspace network, gaining more than 1.5 million friends, through expertly marketing her personal brand.

As social media has become a vehicle for self-branding, these moguls have begun to situate the maintenance of their online brand as a job, which brings about new ways to think about work and labor The logic of online sites and the presence of feedback means that one's online presence is viewed by others using the same rubric to judge brands: evaluation, ranking, and judgment. Thus, social media network sites serve as complex, technologically mediated venues for the branding of the self.

Disclosure 
Personal branding involves the practice of self-disclosure, and this transparency is part of what Foucault would call "the proper care of the self". In this sense, disclosure refers to the details of one's everyday life for other's consumption, while transparency is the effect of this kind of disclosure. Transparency essentially works to give viewers a complete view of one's authentic self.

Digitally aided disclosure, which involves building a self-brand on a social network site, relies on traditional discourses of the authentic self as one that is transparent, without artifice, and open to others. Authenticity is viewed as both residing inside the self and is also demonstrated by allowing the outside world access to one's inner self. It is interesting to think about the idea of authenticity with disclosure, and the freedom social networks allow in disclosing an inauthentic self. All the while, these posting are forming a digital archive of the self, through which a brand could be crafted by others.

Criticisms 
Personal branding offers promises of increased success in the business world. Thousands of self-help books, programs, personal coaches, and articles exist to help individuals learn to self-brand. These strategies emphasize authenticity and are often framed as becoming 'more of who you are' as well as who 'you were meant to be.'

The other side of these 'strategies for success' is that this is very subtle self-commodification. Because personal branding is basically pointing out, and in some cases, glorifying, certain positive characteristics of an individual, it is not unlike traditional branding of products and companies. This puts individuals in the place of products, in which their efforts to appear more human are subverted.

This possibility is exploited by celebrities and politicians, as "marketing individual personalities as products" is an effective way to gain millions of fans not just online but in real life as well. For celebrities of all types, online personas are their brands. Public relations for Justin Bieber and Barack Obama alike can easily control the "brand" and maximize exposure and profitability.

On the other hand, personal branding may afford potential employers the opportunity to more accurately judge a candidate's abilities and cultural suitability, since blogs, profiles, websites, etc., are pieces of work that can be evaluated.

Related ideas

Goffman's self-presentation theory 

Erving Goffman's self-presentation theory explores the way people want to be seen and how people are perceived by their peers. Goffman uses the term Dramaturgy to describe looking at one's own persona as a drama, treating your actions as an actor in a play. One can control how they are viewed by their peers, and in the case of celebrities or athletes, can build a personal brand through utilizing what they present to their publics using various social media outlets. Self-presentation theory and personal branding go hand  in hand, we see celebrities and athletes building a particular brand, or persona over with the use of Twitter, Facebook, Instagram and Snapchat. Building a personal brand is a big part of a celebrity's life, and it can help them spread awareness and also provide an outlet to connect with their fans/supporters. This is made possible through the use of social media and the ability of the person looking to build a personal brand to make their messages heard. The theory of self-presentation looks at how people look to create an identity for themselves that they would like to be seen as by their peers or in the public eye. This is what Goffman calls the front stage.

The front stage is a key component of this theory and it is a way a person acts when in public or around other people to build a certain persona for how they would like others to view them. The front stage is where celebrities and athletes tend to build their own brand and show many positive, deliberate messages that will try to portray them in a certain light in which the person would like to be seen. As opposed to what Goffman refers to as the back stage, which is a particular way a person acts when they are not in public or not posting on social media, trying to build a particular persona or brand they would like others to see.

There are many examples of celebrities building a brand for themselves over some sort of social media platform. In fact, it is rare to see an athlete or celebrity without a social media page whether it is Twitter or Instagram. Celebrities use these outlets as ways of branding themselves, by showing people their lives and having fans feel close to them, almost like they are friends, and have a connection through social media outlets such as Twitter and Instagram. Also, to keep more of their fans interested, and to reach as many as possible many celebrities will update daily on Facebook, Twitter, Instagram and Snapchat so their message can be seen by a wider audience. They can keep fans informed on everything from what they want to wear, to their political views. Social Media has provided a simple way for celebrities to get their personal brand to reach a wider audience, and they utilize the 'front stage'  to influence people in a particular way and to make themselves look good in the public eye.

The 'back stage' is part of Goffman's theory of self-presentation theory, and it is happenings or beliefs people would not want their peers or public to necessarily see or hear. These are happenings that go on behind the scenes that can oftentimes hurt someone's reputation and are avoided when a celebrity is trying to build a personal brand. These are often personal happenings, or beliefs that will negatively effect how an audience will look at the brand you are building. There are numerous examples of celebrities saying something that they did not want their public to hear but got out and this hurts the brand they are building. One example of this is when Los Angeles Clippers owner Donald Sterling made racist comments to his then girlfriend and she had recorded them and put them on her social media. Donald Sterling was quickly removed from the team and is no longer associated with the NBA. This is an example of how something in the back stage will negatively affect what you want the public to see you as.

Self-presentation theory is very apparent in the world of celebrities and professional athletes and is a big part of building a brand for themselves. Goffman's theory seems to identify itself well with the personal branding of these celebrities and you can see why they would want to utilize social media to positively show a message they want to be heard by their public (front stage) and avoid more personal beliefs that may negatively effect their brand (back stage).

See also 
 Creative disruption
 Dandy
 Impression management
 Online identity management
 Reputation capital
 Reputation management

References

Identity (social science)
Types of branding
Reputation management
Personal development